The sinking of Kim Nirvana-B occurred on the morning of 2 July 2015, en route from Ormoc to Pilar in Ponson Island, among the Camotes Islands. It was reported that the ship, a motorized bangka, was overloaded with passengers and cargo that led to it capsizing after making a sharp turn.

Kim Nirvana-B was rated to carry 178 passengers and 16 crew members, but had at least 220 people on board at the time of the accident. Witnesses also reported that a large number of sacks of cement, rice and fertilizer were in the cargo area of the ship. Multiple murder charges were laid against the ferry's owner, captain and 17 crew members following the accident.

In July 2015, the Maritime Industry Authority reported that calculations show overloading was not the cause of the ship's sinking and instead cited the "negligent operations of the captain".

See also 
 List of maritime disasters in the Philippines
 List of maritime disasters in the 21st century

References

2015 disasters in the Philippines
Maritime incidents in 2015
Maritime incidents in the Philippines
History of Leyte (province)
History of Cebu
Shipwrecks
Shipwrecks in the Philippine Sea
July 2015 events in Asia